The 2008 V8 Supercar Championship Series was the tenth V8 Supercar Championship Series and the twelfth series in which V8 Supercars contested the premier Australian touring car title. The championship began on 21 February at the Clipsal 500 on the streets of Adelaide and concluded on 7 December at Oran Park Raceway. It consisted of 14 rounds covering all states and the Northern Territory of Australia as well as rounds in New Zealand and Bahrain. 

Jamie Whincup secured the Drivers championship with two races in hand with victory in race 1 of the 2008 NRMA Motoring & Services Grand Finale. Whincup was also awarded the 49th Australian Touring Car Championship title by CAMS. Triple Eight Race Engineering won the Teams Championship and Ford was awarded the Manufacturers Championship.

Race calendar

Teams and drivers

The following teams and drivers contested the 2008 V8 Supercar Championship Series.

* Phillip Island 500 only
** Bathurst 1000 only

Rule Changes
The points system was changed for 2008. Points were awarded to the top 30 drivers, with 300 points being the most available to a driver in each round.

In Friday practice sessions, drivers who had finished in the top 15 in the 2007 Championship were not permitted to participate for the first 30 minutes.

Technical changes
An option to use sequential gearboxes in lieu of H-pattern gearboxes was introduced. Initially optional, sequential gearboxes later became mandatory.

Driver changes
<div class="driver changes-small">
Russell Ingall signed with Paul Morris Motorsport and raced under the identity of Supercheap Auto Racing.

In a complicated series of moves several drivers have been shuffled around the Holden teams. The juggling began with Todd Kelly signing with Perkins Engineering. Reigning series champion Garth Tander took the #1 plate to the Holden Racing Team with Toll sponsorship and some key personnel led by Rob Crawford transfer across teams with him. And finally, former Supercheap Auto driver Paul Dumbrell took Tander's seat at the HSV Dealer Team.

Second tier Fujitsu series champion team Tony D'Alberto Racing moved to the V8 Supercar series, and took over the running of the Rod Nash Racing owned franchise, replacing Independent Racing Cars who previously operated the team. Tony D'Alberto replaced Steve Owen as driver.

Paul Cruickshank Racing signed Fabian Coulthard to replace the retired John Bowe.

Marcus Marshall drove the Irwin backed Falcon at Britek Motorsport.

Dean Canto announced on his website that he had his contract with Garry Rogers Motorsport terminated a year early. He later drove for Ford Performance Racing in the endurance events.

Garry Rogers Motorsport announced their new driver as Fujitsu series runner up, and WPS Racing enduro driver, Michael Caruso.

Team Kiwi Racing purchased a former Triple Eight Race Engineering Falcon and ran the car themselves. While the team had not made a formal announcement, V8Supercars have published Fujitsu series front runner Kayne Scott as the team's driver. Although due to a date clash with Round 2 and the final of the New Zealand V8 series, Scott was not available and was replaced by Chris Pither.

Reversing a previous decision to fold their team, Paul Weel Racing announced their return for the 2008 season and ran a single VE Commodore for Andrew Thompson.

Former PWR racer Cameron McConville signed with Brad Jones Racing, a team he raced for previously in the mid-90s when it ran the Audi Super Touring program. The team also changed manufacturer camps to become a Holden team and ran with the technical assistance of Walkinshaw Performance, the organisation that runs the Holden Racing Team and HSV Dealer Teams.

Ford Rising Stars Racing named Formula 3 Euroseries racer Michael Patrizi as the driver for their début season. However the team did not make their season debut until the third round of the year at the Hamilton 400. The team utilised the second of the two Paul Weel Racing franchises.

Stone Brothers Racing named teenager Shane van Gisbergen to the #9 Ford Falcon, replacing Russell Ingall. Van Gisbergen was linked to SBR last season and was placed with Team Kiwi Racing in the second half of the season after TKR's previous partnership with Ford Performance Racing dissolved.

Despite previously announcing that they would be forced to sell their franchise from lack of a major sponsor and technical partner, Walden Motorsport had committed to run and V8Supercar's website had named Australian Production Car Championship racer Garth Walden as the driver in the teams Ford Falcon, although it has yet to be confirmed that the team actually have possession of an eligible car. After failing to appear at the first two rounds the franchise has been placed for sale.

WPS Racing announced the closure of the team with the vehicles and equipment sold off to new owners. The franchises have already been sold within TEGA. The team cite business and health issues affecting team principal Craig Gore.

Shane Price was sacked from the Perkins Engineering a week after the Bathurst 1000 and replaced with endurance co-driver Jack Perkins.

Results and standings

Drivers Championship

Teams Championship
Triple Eight Race Engineering won the Teams Championship.

 (s) denotes a single-car team.

Manufacturers Championship
Ford won the Manufacturers Championship having won more rounds than rival Holden.

See also
2008 V8 Supercar season

References

External links

 Official V8 Supercar website
 2008 Racing Results Archive
 2008 V8 Supercar images Retrieved from www.motorsport.com on 20 May 2009

Supercars Championship seasons
V8 Supercar Championship Series